Four ships of the Royal Navy have been named HMS Curacoa, after the island in the Caribbean Sea more usually spelled Curaçao:

, a 36-gun fifth rate launched in 1809.  She was reduced to 24 guns in 1831 and broken up in 1849.
, a wood screw frigate launched in 1854.  She was flagship of the Australia Station during the New Zealand Wars and was broken up in 1869.
, a screw corvette launched in 1878 and sold in 1904.

Royal Navy ship names